Dongfeng Yueda Kia Motor Co., Ltd. is an automotive manufacturing company headquartered in Yancheng, China and a joint venture between Dongfeng Motor Corporation, Jiangsu Yueda Group and Kia.

History
Dongfeng Yueda Kia was founded in 2002.

In August 2003, it was announced that Dongfeng Yueda Kia would invest around US$600 million in the construction of a new assembly
plant in Jiangsu Province with a capacity to produce 400,000 vehicles per year.

In November 2011 Dongfeng Yueda Kia announced that it would construct its third automobile manufacturing plant in Yancheng. Construction of the plant took place between 2012 and 2014. The plant has an annual production capacity of 300,000 cars. 

In December 2021, Dongfeng sold its 25% stake in the joint venture to Jiangsu Yueda for 297 million.

Plants
The Dongfeng-Yueda-Kia's plant in Yancheng, Jiangsu Province manufactures Kia vehicles for the Chinese market. The plant will also accommodate the initial mass production of the HiPhi 1 electric crossover starting from 2021.

Sales

Vehicles
Kia Carnival
Kia Furuidi
Kia K2
Kia K3/K3 Plug-in Hybrid
Kia K4
Kia K5/K5 Hybrid
Kia KX Cross
Kia KX1
Kia KX3
Kia KX3 Aopao
Kia KX5
Kia KX7
Kia Pegas
Kia Sportage
Kia Sportage R

Gallery

References

External links
 

Car manufacturers of China
Chinese-foreign joint-venture companies
Kia Motors
Dongfeng Motor joint ventures